Filmworks XVI: Workingman's Death features a score by John Zorn for a documentary film by Michael Glawogger. The album was released on Zorn's own label, Tzadik Records, in 2005 and contains music that Zorn wrote and recorded for, Workingman's Death (2005), a documentary detailing hazardous employment undertaken in Ukraine, Indonesia, Nigeria, Pakistan, and China.

Track listing
 "Gadani Slipway" - 9:01
 "Juju" - 6:14
 "Sulphur Mining" - 6:29
 "Horn Carrier" - 3:16
 "Atmosphere" - 2:13
 "The Miners" - 3:05
 "Steel Factory" - 6:01
 "Work Trance" - 3:20
 "Ghost Ship" - 2:51
 "Dark Caves" - 3:17
 "Slaughterhouse" - 9:09
 "Guitar Juju" - 6:20

All music by John Zorn
Produced by John Zorn.

Personnel
John Zorn – organ, gamelin
Shanir Ezra Blumenkranz – bass
Jamie Saft – electric piano, guitar
Cyro Baptista – percussion
Ikue Mori – electronic percussion

References

Tzadik Records soundtracks
Albums produced by John Zorn
John Zorn soundtracks
2005 soundtrack albums
Film scores